Aleksandr Mikhailovich Faintsimmer (Feinzimmer, ; 31 December 1906 – 21 March 1982) was a Soviet film director. He has been cited as a filmmaker on the forefront of Russian language social thriller. His son Leonid Kvinikhidze was also a film director.

Filmography 
 The Czar Wants to Sleep (Poruchik Kizhe) (1934), better known as Lieutenant Kijé. Sergei Prokofiev wrote a famous instrumental piece, Lieutenant Kijé, as its main theme.
 Men of the Sea (Baltiytsy) (1938) 
 Tanker "Derbent" (1941)
 Kotovsky (1942)
 Naval Battalion (1944) 
 For Those Who Are at Sea  (1947)
 A Girl with a Guitar (1948)
 They Have a Motherland  (1949)
 Konstantin Zaslonov  (1949) 
 Aušra prie Nemuno (1953)
 The Gadfly   (1955) 
 A Girl with Guitar (1958)
 Night without Mercy (1962) (Noch bez miloserdiya) (Adaptation of a book by )
 Far in the West (1968) 
 50 to 50 (1972) 
 Without the Right to Mistake (1974) 
 The Tavern on Pyatnitskaya  (1978) 
 Farewell tour Artist (1979)

References

External links 

1906 births
1982 deaths
Soviet film directors
Soviet Jews
Stalin Prize winners
Gerasimov Institute of Cinematography alumni
Socialist realist artists